Ľubá is a village and municipality in the Nové Zámky District in the Nitra Region of south-west Slovakia.

History
In historical records, the village was first mentioned in 1247.

Geography
The village lies at an elevation of 193 metres (633 ft) and covers an area of 9.398 km2 (3.629 mi2). It has a population of about 450 people.

Ethnicity
The population is about 11% Slovak, 87% Hungarian and 2% Romany.

Facilities
The village has a public library, a DVD rental store, and a football pitch.

External links
http://www.statistics.sk/mosmis/eng/run.html
Ľubá – Nové Zámky Okolie

Villages and municipalities in Nové Zámky District